The KPGA Championship is a men's professional golf tournament that has been held annually in South Korea since 1958. Together with the Korea Open it is the longest running event on the Korean Tour. It is organised by the Korea Professional Golfers' Association (KPGA). Since 2016 the total purse has been KRW1,000,000,000 with KRW200,000,000 to the winner.

The 2017 Championship was won by Hwang Jung-gon. This win gave him an invitation to play in the CJ Cup in October 2017, the first PGA Tour event played in Korea.

Winners

References

External links
Coverage on the Korean Tour's official site 
Past champions 

Korean Tour events
Golf tournaments in South Korea
Recurring sporting events established in 1958
1958 establishments in South Korea
Summer events in South Korea